Agapanthiola sinae is a species of beetle in the family Cerambycidae. It was described by Dahlgren in 1986.

References

Agapanthiini
Beetles described in 1986